The Khelafat Majlish, also spelt Khelafat Majlis, is a far-right Islamist political party in Bangladesh. The party was founded in Dhaka, the capital of Bangladesh, in 1989 by Deobandi scholar Azizul Haque along with Ahmad Abdul Qadir and former leaders of the National Awami Party and Tamaddun Majlish. Since its founding, it has only ever gained one seat in the country's National Parliament. The party split into two in 2005, with Azizul Haque's faction taking the name Bangladesh Khelafat Majlish.

History
The party was publicly established on 8 December 1989, during a national conference was held at the IEB Auditorium in Dhaka. It was founded by Azizul Haque, who had left the Khilafat Andolan after the death of its founder, Muhammadullah Hafezzi. The party was founded as a union between Islami Jubo Shibir leader Ahmad Abdul Qadir, a splinter group of Abdul Hamid Khan Bhashani's National Awami Party and Tamaddun Majlish founder Professor Masud Khan. Abdul Gaffar was selected as the party's inaugural amir with Masud Khan serving as general secretary and Ahmad Abdul Qadir as vice-secretary. Azizul Haque headed the party's Central Guardian Council, and shortly replaced Abdul Gaffar as amir, with A. R. M. Abdul Matin and Abdur Rab Yusufi becoming the next secretary-generals. Among the party's early activities were participating in the 1990 Mass Uprising in Bangladesh against President Hussain Muhammad Ershad.

On 22 December 1990, Azizul Haque founded the Islami Oikya Jote; a political alliance of six Islamic parties consisting of his Khelafat Majlish, the Islami Shashontantra Andolan party led by Syed Fazlul Karim, the Nizam-e-Islam Party, the Jamiat Ulema-e-Islam led by Abdul Karim Shaykh-e-Kouria, the Khilafat Andolan led by Ahmadullah Ashraf and the Faraizi Jamaat. The alliance participated in the 1991 Bangladeshi general election, gaining one constituency (Sylhet-5) under Obaidul Haque of the Khelafat Majlish.

As a result of the 1992 Demolition of the Babri Masjid in Ayodhya, India, the Majlis organised a march from Dhaka to Ayodhya on 2 January 1993 and demanded its restoration. The protestors, led by Azizul Haque, reached the border near Khulna, where the Government of Bangladesh blocked off the boundaries and suppressed the march. In the same year, Azizul Haque declared on behalf of the Majlis that India's prime minister Narasimha Rao should not visit India and gave orders to besiege the national airport. Haque was coincidentally arrested for this reason on 9 April 1993, though he was later released on 8 May.

In 2005, the party split into two as Azizul Haque did not agree with joining the BNP-led Four Party Alliance. On 22 May 2005, the Central Majlis-ash-Shura session was held at the Hotel Ruposhi Bangla in Paltan, where the Naib-e-Amir Md. Ishaq was elected as the party's amir, and Ahmad Abdul Qadir as the general-secretary. Azizul Haque's party was registered as Bangladesh Khelafat Majlish, and took on the rickshaw as its symbol.

In conjunction with other Islamist parties Khilafat Majlis held street protests in the capital Dhaka condemning Israel for its role in the 2006 Lebanon War. In February 2010, police in Khulna baton-charged Khilafat Majlis activists who were holding street protests, and arrested five. Khilafat Majlis activists were reportedly protesting the arrest of a central party leader Maulana Shakhawat, who had been arrested by the government. In 2021, the Majlis officially quit the BNP Alliance.

Aim

The Khelafat Majlis seeks the establishment of an Islamic state, modelled on the Caliphate, a multi-national religious supranational state. The party seeks the full enforcement of the Sha'riah.

Pact with Awami League
On January 22, 2006 Sheikh Hasina Wajed, the president of the reputedly secular Bangladesh Awami League and the current Prime Minister of Bangladesh, signed a controversial memorandum of understanding with Khelafat Majlish to form a political alliance for the then scheduled 2006 general election. The terms of the pact were reportedly to be designed to give the Awami League, one of the two main political parties in Bangladesh, a share in the vote bank of religious Muslim voters, who formed an important bloc of voters in Muslim-majority Bangladesh. In turn, an Awami League-led government would enact the Majlish agenda of declaring the Ahmadiyya community as non-Muslim, passing a blasphemy law (outlawing expressions of criticism of Islam) and make fatwas (decrees from Muslim clerics) legally binding. However, Sheikh Hasina later claimed that the Khelafat had approached her about forming an alliance, and had promised to support a secular policy.

The pact was severely criticized within Bangladesh and by various leaders of the Awami League, including presidium member Amir Hossain Amu, who criticized Sheikh Hasina for signing the pact without discussing it with other party leaders. By 2007, the pact had been scrapped after Sheikh Hasina returned to Bangladesh from the exile imposed by the interim government (2006–2008). Defending her actions, Sheikh Hasina said that the pact was signed for a "certain period" to resist the "communal-fundamentalist forces" led by the Jamaat-e-Islami Bangladesh. Hasina claimed she was authorised by party leaders to make any decisions to ensure election victory for the Awami League.

See also 
 List of Deobandi organisations

References

Islamist groups
Islamic political parties in Bangladesh
Far-right politics in Bangladesh
Deobandi organisations